is the 17th single by Japanese entertainer Akina Nakamori. Written by Kayoko Fuyumori and Takashi Tsushimi, the single was released on February 4, 1987, by Warner Pioneer through the Reprise label. It was also the fourth single from her third compilation album CD'87.

The single became Nakamori's 15th No. 1 on Oricon's weekly singles chart and sold over 358,100 copies.

Track listing 
All music is arranged by Satoshi Nakamura

Charts

References

External links 
 
 
 

1987 singles
1987 songs
Akina Nakamori songs
Japanese-language songs
Warner Music Japan singles
Reprise Records singles
Oricon Weekly number-one singles